Kerim Erim (1894–1952) was a Turkish mathematician and physicist.

He graduated from the Advanced Vocational School for Engineering in Istanbul (now Istanbul Technical University) in 1914 and received a PhD in Germany. He subsequently became Professor of Analysis and Dean of the Faculty of Science in the newly established Istanbul University.

Kerim Erim's granddaughter is the Turkish classical pianist and State Artist Gülsin Onay.

References

20th-century Turkish mathematicians
Turkish mathematicians
Turkish scientists
1894 births
1952 deaths